Mogens Herman Hansen FBA (born 20 August 1940, Frederiksberg) is a Danish classical philologist and classical demographer who is one of the leading scholars in Athenian Democracy and the Polis.

Academic career
Hansen finished his masters at University of Copenhagen in 1967. The following year he was engaged to work at the same university. He has written many books about the Athenian Democracy. From 1993 to 2005 he was the director of the Copenhagen Polis Centre.

Hansen was visiting fellow at the University of Melbourne, University of British Columbia, Wolfson College (University of Cambridge), Princeton University, and Churchill College (Cambridge). Hansen is a member of the Royal Danish Academy of Sciences, by Deutsches Archäologisches Institut and the British Academy.

In June 2010, Hansen retired after 40 years at Copenhagen University.

Major works in English
The Sovereignty of the People's Court in Athens in the 4th c. B.C. (1974)
The Athenian Assembly (1987)
The Athenian Democracy in the Age of Demosthenes (1991)
Acts of the Copenhagen Polis Centre I-VII (1993-2005)
Papers of the Copenhagen Polis Centre I-VII (1994-2004)
A Comparative Study of 30 City-State Cultures (2000)
Inventory of Archaic and Classical Poleis (2004)

Sources
 Kraks Blå Bog 2006/2007

References

Classical philologists
Fellows of the British Academy
Fellows of Churchill College, Cambridge
Fellows of Wolfson College, Cambridge
Academic staff of the University of Copenhagen
1940 births
Living people